Lindmania steyermarkii is a plant species in the genus Lindmania. This species is endemic to Venezuela.

References

steyermarkii
Flora of Venezuela